Loïc Attely (born 26 November 1977) is a French fencer. He competed in the individual and team foil events at the 2004 Summer Olympics.

References

External links
 

1977 births
Living people
French male foil fencers
Olympic fencers of France
Fencers at the 2004 Summer Olympics
People from Cambrai
Sportspeople from Nord (French department)
21st-century French people